Robert A. Brown House is a historic home located near Harrisonville, Cass County, Missouri. It was built about 1850, and is a two-story, five bay, rectangular, Classic Revival style red brick dwelling.  It has a rear ell and sits on a limestone foundation.  It features a two-story, central wooden portico on the front facade.  Also on the property are the contributing brick slave house, smokehouse, and apple house.

It was listed on the National Register of Historic Places in 1970.

References

Houses on the National Register of Historic Places in Missouri
Neoclassical architecture in Missouri
Houses completed in 1850
Buildings and structures in Cass County, Missouri
National Register of Historic Places in Cass County, Missouri